Musab Adam Ali  (born 17 April 1995) is a Qatari middle-distance runner specialising in the 1500 metres. He qualified for the 2020 Summer Olympics with his personal best time of 3:32.41, which he ran in Doha on 14 February 2021.

At the 2014 Asian Junior Athletics Championships, he won the gold medal in the 3000 metres steeplechase and the 5000 metres. At the 2019 Asian Athletics Championships, he finished third in the 1500 metres.

Personal bests
Outdoor
800 metres – 1:47.62 (Istanbul 2020)
1500 metres – 3:32.41 (Doha 2021)
Mile – 3:53.15 (Oslo 2020)
Indoor
1500 metres – 3:37.30 (Doha 2016)

References

Olympedia

1995 births
Living people
Qatari male middle-distance runners
Athletes (track and field) at the 2020 Summer Olympics
Olympic athletes of Qatar